Sutro Tower is a unique three-legged  tall TV and radio lattice tower located in San Francisco, California. Rising from a hill between Twin Peaks and Mount Sutro near Clarendon Heights, it is a prominent feature of the city skyline and a landmark for city residents and visitors. The tower was the tallest structure in San Francisco from the time of its completion in 1973 until it was surpassed by the Salesforce Tower in 2018.

The tower is named after the family of Adolph Sutro, a businessman and former mayor of San Francisco. His grandson, Adolph Gilbert Sutro, built a mansion, La Avanzada, on their property in the highest peaks of San Francisco. In 1948, the mansion and property was sold to the American Broadcasting Company, where it became the original home of their San Francisco operation as KGO Television. KGO then formed a consortium with KTVU, KRON, and KPIX, the three other major San Francisco television broadcasters at the time, to build and maintain the tower. It is the second tallest structure in the city by ground-to-tip height, though its mountain location overlooks the city's downtown skyscrapers.

History

Before the construction of Sutro Tower in 1973, television reception in San Francisco was spotty because the many hills of the city blocked the line-of-sight television signal. The great height of the new tower helped to resolve that problem. Transmitters had been scattered throughout the Bay Area, including at San Bruno Mountain, Mt. Allison, Monument Peak, and Mt. Diablo. By having all the main Bay Area television station transmitters in one location, reception was improved by allowing a receiving antenna pointed in a single direction to receive all those stations rather than a subset.

Local residents opposed the tower even before it was completed, including criticism of the aesthetic effect the tower would have on the rest of San Francisco. San Francisco writer Herb Caen once wrote, "I keep waiting for it to stalk down the hill and attack the Golden Gate Bridge."

When first built, the long legs of the tower were illuminated at night with long tubes of white light that looked like long fluorescent tubes. However, public outcry resulted in the lights being removed soon after they were turned on. Despite the initial revulsion of some residents, Sutro Tower is now recognized by many as a Bay Area icon.  A local entertainment guide, SF Station, uses it as a logo, as does the collaborative art game SFZero. In 2022, Sutro Tower was included in the video game Horizon Forbidden West as one of the prominent landmarks in the San Francisco area.

Beginning in 2019, one of the three upper antenna assemblies was temporarily removed for the installation of new antennas for the FCC spectrum repacking. Antenna installation for the repacking was completed on May 1, 2020. Additionally, "To accommodate some final project cleanup work, some stations will broadcast from their auxiliary antennas intermittently between mid-July and mid-August."

Construction

Construction began in 1971 by Kline Towers of Columbia, South Carolina. The tower was completed in 1973, with the first transmissions on July 4, 1973. Approximately  of concrete were used to make the foundation of the 3.7 million pound (1,700 ton) tower. Earthquake proofing includes ballasting two-thirds of the weight of the structure below ground, resulting in a center of gravity at sixteen feet below ground level. It is used to transmit the signals of eleven television stations and four FM radio stations and for various other communications services.

The tower is owned by Sutro Tower Inc., a not-for-profit corporation, which in turn is owned by a consortium of the four major television broadcasters in San Francisco at the time of its construction: KTVU (previously owned by Cox Media Group, now owned by Fox Television Stations); KRON-TV (owned by the San Francisco Chronicle at the time of the tower's completion, now owned by Nexstar Media Group); KPIX (a former Westinghouse Broadcasting property, now owned by CBS); and KGO-TV (an ABC-owned station). Sutro Tower also leases space to other Bay Area radio and television stations, including PBS outlet KQED; independent station KOFY-TV; non-commercial station KPJK; and KBCW, a sister station to KPIX. With the advent of channel sharing agreements after the 2016 FCC spectrum auction, San Jose's KQEH began to transmit from Sutro with sister station KQED on January 17, 2018, moving from its former Monument Peak transmitter.

Three other major Bay Area TV stations are unable to be located at Sutro Tower—the NBC-owned duopoly of KNTV and KSTS; and KTVU's duopoly partner KICU-TV. KNTV, which assumed the area's NBC affiliation from KRON-TV in 2002, relocated its transmitter from Loma Prieta Peak to San Bruno Mountain, five miles south of Sutro Tower; KSTS and KICU-TV transmit from east of Fremont. Those locations allow these stations to maintain primary coverage over San Jose and the South Bay, as San Jose is the city of license for all three stations.

Access

The facility is accessible only by authorized vehicles. The area near the site offers beautiful panoramic viewpoints of San Francisco. Only authorized maintenance workers can access the tower via a small two-person elevator that runs inside the west tower enclosed leg. There is no public access within the Sutro Tower property lines.

On a clear day, the tower can be seen from the East Bay peak of Mount Diablo and is sometimes the only part of San Francisco seen above the coastal fog when it is blown inland, typically on summer mornings and evenings.

Stations

Television
TV stations that transmit from Sutro Tower include the following. Most of these stations carry additional subchannels on their frequencies. Subchannel affiliations are shown via the digital channels link.

Radio
FM stations that transmit from Sutro Tower include KOIT (96.5), KSOL (98.9), KOSF (103.7), and KNBR-FM (104.5).

See also 
 Lattice tower
 List of tallest freestanding steel structures
 List of famous transmission sites

References

Further reading

External links

 Official Site of Sutro Tower, Inc
 
 
 Sutrotower.org, "a comprehensive guide to Sutro Tower and Mount Sutro"
 User page with information about Sutro Tower
 Sutro Tower Community Perspectives
 RCA Broadcast Magazine from 1973 detailing engineering
 Fybush.com Tower Site of the Week September 23, 2011
 
 
 

Buildings and structures in San Francisco
Radio masts and towers in the United States
Landmarks in San Francisco
Towers in California
Towers completed in 1973
1973 establishments in California